Jacob Levi Montefiore (11 January 1819 – 24 January 1885) was a businessman, financier, writer and politician in New South Wales, Australia.

He was born at Bridgetown in Barbados to merchant Isaac Jacob Levi and his wife Esther Hannah Montefiore, who was related to Sir Moses Montefiore and the Rothschilds. The children adopted their mother's surname, including Jacob's younger brother Eliezer Levi Montefiore.

In New South Wales he was a squatter and trader. On 9 July 1851 he married Caroline Antonine Gerardine Louyet in London. He was a member of the New South Wales Legislative Council from 1856 to 1860 and again from 1874 to 1877. He was Belgian Consul from 1863. He also published works on economic theory, was chairman of a number of mining companies, campaigned for free trade, and composed the libretto for the opera Don John of Austria with music by Isaac Nathan.

He was a nephew of Jacob Barrow Montefiore and Joseph Barrow Montefiore.

References

 

1819 births
1885 deaths
Members of the New South Wales Legislative Council
19th-century Australian politicians
Australian Sephardi Jews